Persian musical instruments or Iranian musical instruments
can be broadly classified into three categories: classical, Western and folk. Most of Persian musical instruments spread in the former Persian Empires states all over the Middle East, Caucasus, Central Asia and through adaptation, relations, and trade, in Europe and far regions of Asia. In ancient era, the Silk road had an effective role in this distribution.

String instruments 
Orchestral
Tar
Setar
Kamancheh
Ghaychak
Barbat
Chang (instrument)/Angular harp
Santoor
Qānūn
 Shurangiz

Folklore
Dotar
Tanbur
Tar (Azerbaijani instrument)
 Divan (diwan or divan sazı, type of Bağlama)
Sallaneh
Sorahi
Suroz
Rubab (instrument)

Wind instruments 
Orchestral
Ney
Folklores 
Balaban (instrument)
Donali
Doudouk
Dozaleh
Garmon
Karna
Ney-anbān
Sorna

Historical
Nafir

Percussion instruments
While Arabic and Persian are separate languages, to a great extent the cultures intermixed during and after the Arab conquest of Persia. Arabic became the lingua franca from the Middle East to the edge of China and into India, much as Latin was in Europe. As a result, the list below may contain Arab words that don't belong, but may also include words shared by both languages. An example is daf (دایره), for which the Arab word is also daf or duff (plural dofuf'). Similarly, conquests and cultural intermixing have made Turkish words available, such as kudum.

Membranophones

Idiophones

Shaken idiophones

Lamellophones 

Images from Turkestan
These images are from the Russian Turkestan, circa 1865-1872, an area in which Persian, Turkish, Arab/Islamic and Mongol peoples conquered and settled over the ages. When the Russians conquered, both Turkish and Persian languages were being spoken. The images of musical instruments show the mixing of cultures; some such as the tanbur appear normal for Persian culture. But there are variations, such as a kamanche that appears to be a bowed tanbur, and the kauz or kobyz, which is a Turkish word for an instrument that is closely related to the Ghaychak, a Persian instrument.

 Others 
The electronic keyboard is a popular western instrument.

There are numerous native musical instruments used in folk music.

 See also 
 Music of Iran
 Persian traditional music

 References 
Abbas Aryanpur and Manoochehr Aryanpur, The Concise Persian-English Dictionary, Amir Kabir Publication Organization, Tehran, 1990.
David R. Courtney, Fundamentals of Tabla, Vol. I, Sur Sangeet Services, Houston, 1998.
Michael Kennedy, The Concise Oxford Dictionary of Music, Oxford Univ. Press, London, 1980.
Mehran Poor Mandan, The Encyclopedia of Iranian Old Music, Tehran, 2000.
Cemsid Salehpur, Türkçe Farsça Genel Sözlügü, Tehran, 1996.
Mehdi Setayeshgar, Vazhe-Name-ye-Musighi-ye-Iran Zamin'', Tehran, Vol. I (1995) & Vol. II (1996).

External links 

Introduction to Iranian Indigenous and Local Musical Instruments by Kamran Komeylizadeh

 
Musical instruments